Peter Gorewski (born 25 February 1944) is a German former sports shooter. He competed at the 1972 Summer Olympics and the 1976 Summer Olympics for East Germany.

References

External links
 

1944 births
Living people
German male sport shooters
Olympic shooters of East Germany
Shooters at the 1972 Summer Olympics
Shooters at the 1976 Summer Olympics
Sportspeople from Gliwice
20th-century German people